Mourmelon-le-Grand is a commune in the Marne department in north-eastern France.

Population

Camp de Châlons

The camp de Châlons, also known as camp de Mourmelon, is a military camp of circa 10,000 hectares near Mourmelon-le-Grand. It was created at the behest of Napoleon III and opened August 30, 1857 during the Second French Empire.

The Russian Expeditionary Force in France was stationed here in September 1916.

The camp is used for military manoeuvres, and cavalry training, along with the neighbouring 2,500 hectare large Camp de Moronvilliers.

It was also selected to host the shooting events for the 1924 Summer Olympics in neighbouring Paris

During the Second World War, it served as the quarters for the US Army's 501st Infantry Regiment, 101st Airborne Division - who was recovering from the fighting in Holland and waiting on replacements. The regiment would soon play a crucial role in the Battle of Bastogne.

See also
Communes of the Marne department

References

Mourmelonlegrand